Gartcairn W.F.C. is a Scottish women's football team based in Airdrie, North Lanarkshire that plays in the SWPL 2.

History
The team was established in March 2019.
They entered the 2020 Scottish Women's League Division 1 South, On 13 March 2020 the league was indefinitely suspended due to the 2019–20 coronavirus outbreak. The 2020–21 season was also abandoned.  They won the 2021-22 League championship and were promoted to the Scottish Premier League second division two. In June 2022 the SWPL came under the auspices of the SPFL, which controls the men's senior game Gartcairn became one of the inaugural members of the new SWPL 1 and SWPL 2 along with 19 other clubs.

Current squad

On loan

Honours
 2020–21 Scottish Women's Football Championship
 Winners (1): 2020–21 Scottish Women's Football Championship

League History

Backroom staff

See also
 Gartcairn F. A. Juniors

References

External links
Soccerway

Women's football clubs in Scotland
Association football clubs established in 2019
Sport in North Lanarkshire
2019 establishments in Scotland
Scottish Women's Premier League clubs
Scottish Women's Football League clubs